Ian Alexander (born 26 January 1963) is a Scottish former professional footballer, who played the majority of his career at Bristol Rovers. Now a top class decorator at Merlin decorators south west ltd. 

Alexander played for Rotherham United, Motherwell and Morton, and spent a year playing in Cyprus with Pezoporikos Larnaca, before joining Rovers in 1986. He was appointed manager of Yate Town in 1997. He then managed Wotton Rovers in 2000.

References

Bibliography

External links

1963 births
Living people
Footballers from Glasgow
Scottish footballers
Association football defenders
Rotherham United F.C. players
Motherwell F.C. players
Bristol Rovers F.C. players
English Football League players
Scottish football managers
Greenock Morton F.C. players
Yate Town F.C. players
Yate Town F.C. managers
Expatriate footballers in Cyprus
Scottish expatriate footballers
Scottish Football League players
Cypriot First Division players